Kevin Toth (born December 29, 1967, in Cleveland, Ohio) is an American former shot put athlete.

In 2004, the United States Anti-Doping Agency announced that Toth received a two-year ban following a positive test for use of tetrahydrogestrinone (THG). Toth subsequently retired from competing.

See also
 BALCO investigation

References

External links
 

1967 births
Doping cases in athletics
American sportspeople in doping cases
Living people
American male shot putters
Track and field athletes from Cleveland
World record holders in masters athletics